The Commission to Investigate the Norwegianisation Policy and Injustice Against the Sámi and Kven/Norwegian Finnish Peoples (The Truth and Reconciliation Commission) is a Norwegian state commission established by the Storting in 2018. It is led by Dagfinn Høybråten and with a committee consisting of eleven other professionals.

The purpose of the investigation is to lay the foundation for recognition of the experiences of Sámi and Kven (Norwegian Finns) subject to Norwegian authorities' policies of Norwegianization, and the consequences these experiences have had for them as groups and individuals.

The Commission will complete its work by 1 September 2022 and submit its report to the Storting's Presidency.

Mandate
The commission has a three-part mandate to carry out:

 It will produce a historical survey Norwegian authorities' policy and activities towards Sámi and Kvens / Norwegian Finns both locally, regionally and nationally.
 It will investigate the effects of the Norwegianization policy, including how it has affected the majority population's views of Sami, Kvens / Norwegian Finns, and the significance of Norwegianization to this day.
 It will suggest measures further reconciliation.

On 9 May 2019, the commission decide the Forest Finns in its mandate.

Structure

A secretariat for the Truth and Reconciliation Commission, headed by Liss-Ellen Ramstad, was established at University of Tromsø – The Arctic University of Norway.

Membership
 Secretary General Dagfinn Høybråten
 Professor Ivar Bjørklund
 Fellow Håkon Hermanstrand
 Bishop Emeritus Per Oskar Kjølaas
 Professor Pia Lane
 Senior advisor Anne Kalstad Mikkelsen
 Museum director Marit Myrvoll
 Professor Emeritus Einar Niemi
 Professor Anne Julie Semb
 College lecturer Liv Inger Somby
 Professor Emeritus Aslak Syse
 Associate Professor Ketil Zachariassen

References

External links
 Truth and Reconciliation Commission Website (english)

Truth and reconciliation commissions
2018 in Norway
Truth and reconciliation reports